Großendorf or Grossendorf may refer to:
A city district of Büdingen, Germany
A district of Ried im Traunkreis, Austria
The German name of Săliște, Romania
The German name of Władysławowo, Poland